Bromine trifluoride is an interhalogen compound with the formula BrF3. At room temperature, it is a straw-coloured liquid with a pungent odor which decomposes violently on contact with water and organic compounds. It is a powerful fluorinating agent and an ionizing inorganic solvent. It is used to produce uranium hexafluoride (UF6) in the processing and reprocessing of nuclear fuel.

Synthesis
Bromine trifluoride was first described by Paul Lebeau in 1906, who obtained the material by the reaction of bromine with fluorine at 20 °C:

The disproportionation of bromine monofluoride also gives bromine trifluoride:

Structure
Like ClF3 and IF3, the BrF3 molecule is T-shaped and planar. In the VSEPR formalism, the bromine center is assigned two electron pairs. The distance from the bromine each axial fluorine is 1.81 Å and to the equatorial fluorine is 1.72 Å. The angle between an axial fluorine and the equatorial fluorine is slightly smaller than 90° — the 86.2° angle observed is due to the repulsion generated by the electron pairs being greater than that of the Br-F bonds.

Chemical properties
In a highly exothermic reaction, BrF3 reacts with water to form hydrobromic acid and hydrofluoric acid:

BrF3 is a fluorinating agent, but less reactive than ClF3. Already at -196 °C, it reacts with acetonitrile to give 1,1,1-trifluoroethane.

 +  Br2 +  N2

The liquid is conducting, owing to autoionisation:

Fluoride salts dissolve readily in BrF3 forming tetrafluorobromate:

It reacts as a fluoride donor:

References

External links
 WebBook page for BrF3

Bromine(III) compounds
Fluorides
Interhalogen compounds
Fluorinating agents
Oxidizing agents
Substances discovered in the 1900s